Nagar Baul (English: Baul of the City), original name Feelings, is a Bangladeshi rock band formed by James,  Ayub Bachchu , and Kumar Bishwajit in Chittagong in 1977. The band is remembered as one of the pioneers of rock music and iconic in Bangladesh. The leadman of the Band, James, is referred to as Guru of Rock is a mark of respect.

History
Nagar Baul started in 1977 and was originally named Feelings. Band members included Ayub Bachchu and James. Ayub Bachchu left the bank in 1980 to join Souls.

They released their first album, Station Road. James, lead vocal and guitarist, composed all the tracks, and wrote the lyrics for five of them. Though the album was not a hit, the tracks Ager Jonome, Amai Jete Dao and Rupshagor enjoyed moderate success.

In 1993, they released their second album Jail Theke Bolchhi. This album was a major hit, and Feelings became a mainstream band.

In 1996, they released their third album Nagar Baul. The Daily Star wrote, "Nagar Baul introduced Bangladesh to a whole new way of singing". It had the "classic" and "iconic" song, "Taray Taray Rotiye Debo".

In 1998, they released their fourth album Lais Fita Lais.

In 1999/2000, the band was renamed from Feelings to Nagar Baul.

In 2001, their fifth album was released Dushtur Cheler Dol. This was their first album release under the new band name Nagar Baul, named after their album from 1996.

Members
Present members
 James — vocals, lead guitars 
 Ahsan Elahi Fanty – drums 
 Sultan Raihan Khan – lead guitars 
 Talukdar Sabbir – bass guitar 
 Khokhon Chakrabarty – Keyboard

Past members
 Ayub Bachchu – lead guitars 
 Saidul Hasan Swapan – bass guitar  joined Love Runs Blind
 Pantha Kanai – drums 
 Khayem Ahmed – keyboards 
 Kumar Bishwajit – vocals

Discography
 "স্টেশন রোড (Station Road) (1987) (Originally known as Feelings)
 "জেল থেকে বলছি (Speaking from Jail)" (1993)
 "নগর বাউল (City Baul)" (1996)
 "লেইস ফিতা লেইস (Lace Ribbon Lace)" (1998)
 "দুষ্ট ছেলের দল (Mischievous Boys' Party)" (2001)

Station Road (1988)

Released by Doel Products

Personnel
 James – lead guitar, vocals
 Ahsan Elahi (Fanty) – drums, percussion
 Pablo – keyboards, clarinet, flute, vocals
 Swapan – bass

Jail Theke Bolchhi (1993)

Personnel
 James – lead guitar, vocals, cover concept
 Ahsan Elahi(Fanty) – drums, percussion
 Tanvir Ibrahim– keyboards
 Babu- Bass

Nagar Baul (1996)

Personnel
 James – lead guitar, vocals, cover concept
 Ahsan Elahi (Fanty) – drums, percussion
 Babu – bass
 Asad – keyboards

Lais Fita Lais (1998)

Personnel
 James – lead guitar, vocals, cover concept
 Ahsan Elahi (Fanty) – drums, percussion
 Babu – bass
 Asad – keyboards

Dustu Chheler Dol (2001)

Personnel
 James – lead guitar, vocals
 Asad – keyboards
 Tajul – bass
 Romel – drums, percussion

References

Bangladeshi rock music groups
1977 establishments in Bangladesh
Musical groups established in 1977
Musical groups from Chittagong